Music Complete is the tenth studio album by English rock band New Order. It was released on 25 September 2015 by Mute Records, their debut on the label. The album features guest vocals from Elly Jackson of La Roux, Iggy Pop, and Brandon Flowers of The Killers.

During summer 2015, New Order promoted the album through online media, at Lollapalooza Chile with "Singularity" and "Plastic", and half-minute snippets directly on their YouTube account. Founding member Gillian Gilbert returned to the band after a decade's hiatus, and Phil Cunningham who initially replaced Gilbert, remained in the band, however, bassist Tom Chapman replaced founding member Peter Hook who quit over creative and personal differences, which made this the first New Order album to be recorded as a five-piece band, instead of a quartet.

Musically, the album is more electronic-focused than its two predecessors, and New Order's first of new material for ten years; the previous original album, 2013's Lost Sirens, consisted solely of unreleased archival recordings from 2003–04, which was recorded at the same time as 2005's Waiting for the Sirens' Call, but was never released as the original bassist Peter Hook left the band in 2007. The cover art was designed by long-time collaborator Peter Saville and comprises a montage of lines with four colour schemes: red, yellow, green, and blue. The placement of the colours varies depending on the format of release.

Music Complete was released on CD, LP (on both clear vinyl and standard black), and digital download on 25 September 2015, with an 8-record deluxe box set released on 20 November. It received generally positive reviews from critics. A tour in support of the album ran from 4 November 2015 through 20 December 2015.

Background
Music Complete marks a return to a more electronic direction compared to New Order's previous two albums, which had been more guitar-based. This is the first album without former bassist Peter Hook, as well as the recorded debut of Tom Chapman and the return of Gillian Gilbert, who had taken leave from the band in 2001, but toured with them from 2011 onwards. Guest backing vocals are provided by Denise Johnson and Dawn Zee, who have performed with the band on their last three albums.

In March and July 2014, the band revealed their first new songs on tour at Lollapalooza Chile and in the United States: "Plastic" and "Singularity".

On 2 and 4 September 2014, Billboard, along with Stereogum and Consequence of Sound reported that New Order had signed on to Mute Records and that future releases were expected, at the time planned to be EPs which would then be "probably put together as an album." Billboard also announced Bernard Sumner's autobiography, Chapter and Verse, which was released on 24 September of the same year.

On 22 June, the official New Order site announced the release date and title of the album, Music Complete. The website also provided terms of distribution: CD, digital download, and limited edition clear vinyl, along with an exclusive 8-piece deluxe vinyl collection that includes the album plus extended versions of all 11 tracks on coloured vinyl.

On 22 June, 30 June, and 7 July, the official New Order YouTube channel uploaded three separate teasers that included snippets of music from the album.

On 29 July, "Restless" was released as the first single for the album. On 19 October, "Tutti Frutti" was released as the album's second single. A third single, "Singularity", was released 18 March 2016. "People on the High Line" was released as the fourth single on 29 July 2016, announced with a fan music video competition.

Promotion

Packaging
The artwork for Music Complete was created by New Order's long-time art director and collaborator Peter Saville. The artwork features a montage of lines with the colours red, yellow, green and blue. Depending on the type of format, the colour schemes vary. For the CD, the pattern clockwise from top right is yellow, red, blue and green. The LPs are red, yellow, green and blue. Digital downloads are the regular format; blue, green, red and yellow. The deluxe edition's artwork is the same as the album, but all six coloured vinyl sleeves are different styles, and have no colour. The six coloured vinyl range from red to purple.

Release
Music Complete was released on 25 September in five different formats: CD, regular and limited-edition double-clear LP, digital download, and an 8-piece deluxe vinyl box set. All CD and LP orders come with MP3 and audio downloads of the album. The deluxe box set includes the clear double LP, along with extended versions of all 11 tracks on six different coloured vinyl. The box set was released on 6 November 2015. A limited edition re-release was issued for Love Record Stores day, 20 June 2020. The double vinyl LP was pressed in orange vinyl and issued in a gatefold sleeve. The release included a 12 page booklet.

Reception 

Music Complete received generally positive reviews from critics. On Metacritic, the album has a weighted average score of 76 out of 100 based on 21 reviews, which indicates "generally favorable reviews". Mixmags S. Worthy described the record as "an album of outstanding pop, shuddering dance-rock and intricate electronic moods. Barry Walters of Rolling Stone wrote: "Just as Curtis' suicide inspired his bandmates to reinvent themselves as New Order in 1980, Hook's departure frees them to create their most varied and substantial work in decades." Michael Roffman of Consequence of Sound called Music Complete "the rare late era LP that blossoms with life, while also echoing the past", while Tim Jonze of The Guardian wrote that the album "feels like the freshest thing they've done in ages."

Pitchfork critic T. Cole Rachel called it their most refined album since Technique, and remarked that Music Complete sounds like "classic New Order" and that the album "certainly doesn’t do anything to diminish New Order’s formidable legacy, but it doesn’t necessarily expand upon it either." Stephen Dalton of Uncut felt that it "drags and trundles in places", but is "easily New Order's best album since Technique, and probably their most musically diverse ever." In a less favourable review, Tim Sendra of AllMusic called it "a watered-down and uninspired album by a band that lost the plot long ago and can now only capture an occasional glimmer of what made it so great in the first place." Concluding a less favourable 1 of 5 star review, Truck & Driver wrote: "...full of soggy, uninspired self-indulgent material that sounds like a mish-mash of 80s B-sides. Save your money."

Accolades

Track listing

Tour
The band embarked on an initial tour in support of Music Complete from 4 November 2015 to 20 December 2015, with tour dates held across Europe and the UK plus stops at the Clockenflap festival in Hong Kong and the Day for Night Festival in the United States. Future tour plans include the 2016 Sónar Festival in Barcelona.

Personnel

New Order
Musician credits for New Order are not listed in the liner notes of the album's personnel. Below are the instruments that the group typically plays.

Bernard Sumner – vocals, guitar, keyboards, synthesisers
Stephen Morris – drums and percussion, keyboards, synthesisers, drum programming
Gillian Gilbert – keyboards, synthesisers
Phil Cunningham – guitars, keyboards, synthesisers, electronic percussion
Tom Chapman – bass, backing vocals, synthesisers

Production
The liner notes list the album's personnel as follows:
New Order – producer 
Rebecca Boulton and Andrew Robinson (at Prime Management) – Management
Daniel Miller – executive producer
Tom Rowlands – producer 
Stuart Price – additional production 
Danny Davies – engineering, pre-production
Jim Spencer – additional engineering (Eve Studios, Stockport)
Rafael Pereira – additional engineering (Elite Music studios, Miami)
Robert Root – additional engineering (Battle Born studios, Las Vegas)
Steve Dub – additional engineering (Rowlands Audio Research)
Craig Silvey – mixing (Toast studios, London) 
Eduardo de la Paz – mixing assistant (Toast studios, London) 
Richard X and Pete Hofmann – mixing 
Iggy Pop – vocals 
Brandon Flowers – vocals, mixing 
La Roux – vocals , backing vocals 
Dawn Zee – backing vocals 
Denise Johnson – backing vocals 
Giacomo Cavagna – Italian spoken vocal

Strings
Joe Duddell – string arrangements, conductor (Manchester Camerata Strings) 
Katie Stillman – violin
Paula Smart – violin
Karen Mainwaring – violin
Simmy Singh – violin
Sophie Mather – violin
Gemma Bass – violin
Anthony Banks – violin
Sian Goodwin – violin
Rachel Jones – viola
Jordan Bowron – viola
Nathaniel Boyd – cello
Barbara Grunthal – cello
Daniel Storer – double bass
Strings recorded at 80 Hertz Studios, The Sharp Project, Manchester
George Atkins – engineer (strings)

Technical
Frank Arkwright – mastering (Abbey Road Studios)
Peter Saville – art direction
Paul Hetherington – design

Charts

Certifications

References

External links
 

2015 albums
Albums produced by Stuart Price
Mute Records albums
New Order (band) albums